The Life is a 2004 Canadian television film directed by Lynne Stopkewich and written by Alan Di Fiore and Chris Haddock.

External links

2004 television films
2004 films
Canadian drama television films
English-language Canadian films
2004 crime drama films
Films set in Vancouver
Canadian crime drama films
2000s English-language films
2000s Canadian films